Tajudeen Gbadebo Olusanya Gbadamosi (alias T.G.O. Gbadamosi, born 15 June 1939) is a Nigerian historian and retired academic, who was a professor of history at the University of Lagos, Nigeria. His areas of research interests included African history, Nigerian history, Yoruba history, and the history of Islam in Africa with a particular emphasis on Nigeria.

Early life and education 
Tajudeen Gbadamosi was born in Ondo State, where he attended Ondo Boys’ High School from 1952 to 1956, before moving to King's College, Lagos, where he completed his secondary school education in 1958. He proceeded to the University College, Ibadan the following year, obtaining his bachelor's degree in history in 1962. In 1965, he obtained his Ph.D. in history from the same institution.

Career 
Gbadamosi began his teaching career as a foundational faculty at the newly established Department of History at the University of Lagos, Nigeria in October 1965. He rose through the ranks from then until he was appointed a full professor in December 1982. From 2005 to 2006, Gbadamosi was a Fulbright Scholar-in-Residence at LeMoyne-Owen College, Memphis, Tennessee, U.S. He was a Visiting Associate Professor of History at King Abdulaziz University, Jeddah, Saudi Arabia from 1979 to 1980; and a visiting scholar at the University of London's School of Oriental and African Studies (SOAS), London in 1971 and 1978.

He is a member of the following professional bodies: Nigerian Academy of Letters, Historical Society of Nigeria, Canadian Association of America Studies, African Studies Association of America, Nigerian Institute of International Affairs, Nigerian Institute of Management, Nigeria–Arab Association, and Counseling Association of Nigeria.

Personal life
Chief Gbadamosi was married to Chief Jumoke Gbadamosi (née Shadare), a member of an Akure royal family. Prior to her death, both he and his wife held titles in the Nigerian chieftaincy system.

Selected publications 

 Aderibigbe, A.B. & T.G.O. Gbadamosi, A History of the University of Lagos, 1962–1987 (Lagos: University of Lagos Press, 1987)
 Gbadamosi, T.G.O. The Growth of Islam Among the Yoruba, 1841–1908 (Lagos: Longman, 1978).
 Gbadamosi, T.G.O. “Years of Development 1967–1975”, in  A History of the University of Lagos, 1962–2012, edited by R.T. Akinyele & Olufunke Adeboye (Lagos: University of Lagos Press, 2013)
 Gbadamosi, T.G.O. “Sharia in Nigeria: Experience of Southern Nigeria”, in Understanding Sharia in Nigeria, edited by A.M. Yakubu, A.M. Kani & M. Junaid, 2001.
 Gbadamosi, T.G.O. “Confronting Reproductive Health within the context of Islam”, in Reproductive Health Within the Context of Islam, edited by Lai Olurode (Lagos: Irede Printers, 2000)
 Gbadamosi, T.G.O., & Junaid, M.O. “Islamic Culture and the Nigerian Society”, in Nigerian Peoples and Cultures, edited by Akinjide Osuntokun and Ayodeji Olukoju (Ibadan: Davidson Press, 1997)
 Gbadamosi, T.G.O. “Islam, Trade and State in the Western Sudan: A Review of Approaches and Attitudes”, al-Fikr V, no.1 (1984): 1–16
 Gbadamosi, T.G.O. “Key Issues in Anglo-Yoruba Muslim Relations, 1884-1914”, in African Notes IX, no.1 (1983): 9–22
 Gbadamosi, T.G.O. “Islam & Christianity in Nigeria”, in Groundwork of Nigerian History, edited by Obaro Ikime (Lagos: Heinemann, 1980), pp. 347–366
 Gbadamosi, T.G.O. “'Odu Imale’: Islam in Ifa Divination and the Case of Pre-Destined Muslim”, Journal of Historical Society of Nigeria 4 (1977): 77–93
 Gbadamosi, T.G.O. “Patterns and Developments in Lagos Religious History”, in Lagos: The Development of an African City, edited by A.B. Aderibigbe (Lagos: Longman, 1975), 173-196
 Gbadamosi, T.G.O. “The Imamate Question Among Yoruba Muslims”, Journal of Historical Society of Nigeria IV, no. 2 (1972): 229–237
 Gbadamosi, T.G.O. “The Establishment of Western Education Among Muslims in Nigeria: 1896–1926”, Journal of Historical Society of Nigeria IV, no. 1 (1976): 89–115

References

University of Ibadan alumni
Academic staff of the University of Lagos
20th-century Nigerian historians
Historians of Nigeria
Historians of Islam
Yoruba historians

Yoruba academics

1939 births

Living people